Carpool is a web series presented by English actor and comedian Robert Llewellyn. In each episode he interviews a guest while giving them a lift in an eco-friendly car (normally a Toyota Prius hybrid electric vehicle). The guests are often well-known British television personalities such as Jonathan Ross or Ade Edmondson. However, Llewellyn also interviews less-well-known figures as long as he feels that they will prove to be an interesting subject. The guests also included Llewellyn's fellow Red Dwarf actors, Danny John Jules, Craig Charles, Chris Barrie and Hattie Hayridge (as well as Tony Hawks, Arthur Smith and Ruby Wax who all appeared in cameo roles in Red Dwarf, while Ed Bye, the show's producer/director, was the first person interviewed for the series). Llewellyn has also reunited with his Scrapheap Challenge co-hosts, Cathy Rogers and Lisa Rogers for interviews.

The show was filmed using small cameras mounted within the car. Llewellyn drives his guest to a destination of their choosing as they talk informally about a variety of subjects. As Llewellyn is driving for the majority of the time, it can be difficult to deal with technical problems especially interference from mobile phones. Occasionally, as in the Lisa Rogers episode, outside events such as being stopped by police interrupt the discussions.

The TV show, based on the web format, has been developed by RDF. Funded and sponsored by Toyota, Carpool was first broadcast on Dave on 4 November 2010.
Carpool has been shortlisted for best content partnership in Broadcast Awards.

Episodes

Dave series guests

Technical failures
Some shows were filmed, but due to technical failures, the episodes were never released. This is a list of them, along with the technical errors that occurred.
Helen Lederer – Out of focus picture and inaudible sound.
John Hegley – A "total sound fail".
Nick Carpenter – Camera batteries were flat. (Filmed on the Silverstone GP Track)
Cathy Rogers – Microphone failed halfway through, the first half was shown in her other episode

Commissioning
At London Film and Comic Con in July 2009, Danny John-Jules mentioned that RDF Productions (the production company behind Scrapheap Challenge) had commissioned Carpool for broadcast and that Llewellyn is re-shooting a number of episodes in high-definition video for broadcast.

On 30 June 2010, it was announced that new shows will appear on the UKTV channel, Dave, as well as still appearing online after broadcast and that the format of the show will remain unchanged.

See also

Comedians in Cars Getting Coffee
Peter Kay's Car Share
Carpool Karaoke

References

External links
Carpool channel on YouTube
Carpool official iPhone App

British television talk shows
Automotive web series
British non-fiction web series